Bangaly Kaba (born 17 February 1959) is a French basketball player. He competed in the men's tournament at the 1984 Summer Olympics.

References

External links
 

1959 births
Living people
French men's basketball players
Olympic basketball players of France
Basketball players at the 1984 Summer Olympics
Basketball players from Dakar
Senegalese emigrants to France